The Iowa–Nebraska football rivalry is an American college football rivalry between the Iowa Hawkeyes and Nebraska Cornhuskers. The rivalry is usually held on the Friday after Thanksgiving.

History
The proximity of the two teams played an important role in the early days of the game, with exclusive trains running between Iowa City and Lincoln to allow fans to travel. The first meeting of the series, which occurred on Thanksgiving day in Omaha, Nebraska, was the first game Iowa had ever played outside of its home state. Other notable games during the 20th century occurred during the four-year renewal of the rivalry from 1979 to 1982. In the 1979 meeting, #7 Nebraska prevailed over unranked Iowa after overcoming a two-touchdown deficit late in the third quarter, which resulted in a standing ovation from fans of both teams. In the 1981 meeting, unranked Iowa upset #7 Nebraska at Kinnick Stadium in what legendary Iowa coach Hayden Fry called "the biggest win since I’ve been here."

After Nebraska moved to the Big Ten Conference, the teams have played annually on the Friday following Thanksgiving. Starting in 2011, the game was referred to as the "Heroes Game" and the Heroes Trophy was awarded to the winner of the game. The Heroes game, which is sponsored by Hy-Vee, is used to recognize individuals from each state for acts of heroism in their communities. In 2017 it was announced by the Big Ten Conference that in 2020 and 2021, the game would not take place on the Friday following Thanksgiving. After significant opposition from fans, Nebraska athletic director Bill Moos made it a priority to restore the game to the Friday after Thanksgiving; accordingly, the Big Ten has scheduled the Iowa-Nebraska game for the Friday after Thanksgiving for all future post-2021 games through 2025. In the end, due to schedule changes related to the COVID-19 pandemic, the 2020 and 2021 games were ultimately rescheduled to Black Friday as well.

Since joining the Big Ten, Nebraska has beaten Iowa four times, three times on the road and once at home.

Game results

See also  
 List of NCAA college football rivalry games

References

External links
 Iowa–Nebraska series history 

College football rivalries in the United States
Iowa Hawkeyes football
Nebraska Cornhuskers football
Big Ten Conference rivalries